Jesús Manuel Orlando Álvarez Monge (February 28, 1952 – March 31, 2016) was a Puerto Rican professional baseball player.

Álvarez signed with the Dodgers in 1970 and had a 12-season career in minor league baseball, during which he batted over .300 three times. In 1973, he led the Double-A Eastern League in hits (139) and was selected to the All-Star team. He had three consecutive past-September-1 trials with the Dodgers from 1973 through , garnering only one hit in nine at bats and ten games played. Traded to the Angels on March 31, 1976, he had his most extended stay in MLB that season; appearing in 15 games during May and June, he collected six hits, including his only two big-league home runs, and was credited with eight runs batted in.

His professional career ended in the Triple-A Mexican League in 1984. Orlando Álvarez died from complications of diabetes in his native Canóvanas at the age of 64. He was buried at the Río Grande Municipal Cemetery in Río Grande, Puerto Rico.

Transactions
Before 1970 season– Signed as a free agent with the Los Angeles Dodgers.
March 31, 1976– Traded to the California Angels in exchange for Ellie Rodríguez and cash.

See also
 List of Major League Baseball players from Puerto Rico

References

Obituary

1952 births
2016 deaths
Albuquerque Dukes players
Bakersfield Dodgers players
Cafeteros de Córdoba players
California Angels players
Daytona Beach Dodgers players
Deaths from diabetes
Indianapolis Indians players
Liga de Béisbol Profesional Roberto Clemente outfielders
Lobos de Arecibo players
Los Angeles Dodgers players
Major League Baseball outfielders
Major League Baseball players from Puerto Rico
New Orleans Pelicans (baseball) players
Oklahoma City 89ers players
People from Río Grande, Puerto Rico
Philadelphia Phillies scouts
Puerto Rican expatriate baseball players in Mexico
Puerto Rico Boricuas players
Rieleros de Aguascalientes players
Salt Lake City Gulls players
Senadores de San Juan players
Tigres del México players
Vaqueros de Bayamón players
Waterbury Dodgers players